Taphropeltus is a genus of true bugs belonging to the family Rhyparochromidae.

The species of this genus are found in Europe.

Species:
 Taphropeltus andrei (Puton, 1877)
 Taphropeltus contractus

References

Drymini
Hemiptera genera